Marisa Matarazzo is an American author. She is best known for her collection of interconnected short stories, Drenched, published by Soft Skull Press, an imprint of Counterpoint.

Biography
She is from Los Angeles, California. 
She is the daughter of abstract artist Francine Matarazzo and John H. Schumann, a professor and researcher of Applied Linguistics. Her half-brother (from her mother's first marriage to Gregory Peck's son Stephen Peck) is actor Ethan Peck.

She earned her BA from Yale, where she received the Wallace Prize for fiction writing, and the Arthur Willis Colton Scholarship. Earning her MFA from UC Irvine, she was the recipient of the Dorothy and Donald Strauss Endowed Thesis Fellowship.

Matarazzo's works have been published in Faultline, Hobart, Fivechapters, and several other literary journals, and she has taught at UCLA Extension Writers' Program.  Her work has also been performed by WordTheatre.

She is an assistant professor in the MFA Writing Program at Otis College of Art and Design, Los Angeles and is currently at work on a novel.

She was a two-time recipient of the Elmore A. Willets Prize for fiction.

Bibliography
Drenched:Stories of Love and Other Deliriums (2010) 
Unstuck Volume 1 (2011)

References

External links 
Book reviews

LAist

Living people
Place of birth missing (living people)
Year of birth missing (living people)
21st-century American women writers
Otis College of Art and Design faculty
American women academics
21st-century American short story writers